Little Muppet Monsters is a Saturday morning television series featuring the Muppets that aired three episodes on CBS in 1985. The first season of Muppet Babies did so well in the ratings, that CBS decided to expand the series from a half-hour to an hour, pairing Muppet Babies with Little Muppet Monsters. They called the hour-long package Muppets, Babies and Monsters.

Plot
The show was anchored by three young Muppet monsters: Tug (performed by Richard Hunt), Molly (performed by Camille Bonora), and Boo (performed by David Rudman). The three have started their own basement show following an incident where Scooter has them put in the basement after Molly and Boo played water polo in the living room. They are joined by Nicky Napoleon (performed by James Kroupa) and his Emperor Penguins as their music act.

Production
Storyboard director Scott Shaw discussed the show in MuppetZine issue #3 (Winter 1993). "The concept of this second half-hour was neither simple nor particularly well-developed," he said. "A trio of new (live-action) Muppet Monster Kids, working from the basement of the adult Muppets' home, create their own television station which broadcasts only to the TV sets in the house upstairs. Their 'shows' were such regular segments as "Pigs in Space: The Animated Series", "Kermit the Frog, Private Eye", "Muppet Sport Shorts" with Animal, "Gonzo's Freaky Facts and Oddball Achievements," and "Fozzie's Comedy Corner", among others.

Although thirteen episodes were produced (most  of which were incomplete at the time of cancellation), only three of them ever aired. According to Muppet performer Kathryn Mullen, and the Henson Company archives, Marvel Productions failed to deliver the full season's animated segments in time for airing. CBS responded by rerunning episodes of Muppet Babies to fill the second half hour until Marvel finished the series' animated segments. Due to high ratings from the Muppet Babies reruns, the network decided not to pick up the remaining episodes of Little Muppet Monsters. The three completed episodes never appeared on television after their initial air dates. Plans to officially re-release the three episodes have not been made.

Despite its quick cancellation, the theme song to Little Muppet Monsters lived on; the instrumental version of the song became the closing theme for Muppet Babies and remained so until the show ended in 1991.

In 1991, segments of the animated "Pigs in Space" and "Kermit the Frog, Private Eye" from the second episode of Little Muppet Monsters titled "Space Cowboys" were re-shown in the final episode of Muppet Babies titled "Eight Flags Over the Nursery".

Cast

Muppet performers

Richard Hunt as Tug Monster, Scooter, and Janice
Camille Bonora as Molly Monster
David Rudman as Boo Monster
Jim Henson as Kermit the Frog and Dr. Teeth
Frank Oz as Miss Piggy, Fozzie Bear, and Animal
Jerry Nelson as Floyd Pepper
Dave Goelz as Gonzo and  Zoot
Pam Arciero as Penguin
Cheryl Blalock as Cow, Raggmopp
Michael Earl Davis as Penguin
 Jim Kroupa as Nicky Napoleon
Noel MacNeal as Rat, Cow, Magic Book
Kathryn Mullen as Penguin, Rat
Martin P. Robinson as Rat, Cow, Walrus

Animated segments voice cast
Greg Berg as Fozzie Bear, Dr. Julius Strangepork
Bob Bergen as Dr. Bunsen Honeydew, Link Hogthrob
Richard Hunt as Beaker, Animated Muppet Shorts Narrator
Hal Rayle as Animal, Gonzo, Miss Piggy
Frank Welker as Kermit the Frog, Chicken Who Crossed the Road, Banana Nose Maldonado (episode 1), Milo Sockdrawer (episode 3)

Episodes

Crew
 Hank Saroyan – Producer, Voice Director

Creators
 Characters designed by: Michael K. Frith
 Tug built by: Ed Christie
 Molly built by: Joanne Green
 Boo built by: Rollie Krewson

References

External links
 
 

1985 American television series debuts
1985 American television series endings
1980s American children's comedy television series
American television series with live action and animation
American television shows featuring puppetry
American television spin-offs
CBS original programming
The Muppets television series
Television series about children
Television series about monsters
Television series by The Jim Henson Company
Television series by Marvel Productions
Television series by Claster Television